New Distances is the first studio album by the international collaborative mathcore band  Narrows.

Track listing
All music by Narrows, all lyrics by Dave Verellen except "Gypsy Kids" by Shawn Brown.
 "Chambered" − 2:17
 "Sea Witch" − 2:15
 "A Restoration Effort" − 3:22
 "I Give You Six Months" − 2:48
 "Changing Clothes" − 2:48
 "Newly Restored" − 4:44
 "The Fourragere" − 3:04
 "Gypsy Kids" − 6:13 
 "Marquis Lights" − 4:06

Personnel
New Distances personnel adapted from CD liner notes.

Narrows
 Jodie Cox – guitar
 Ryan Frederiksen – guitar
 Rob Moran – bass guitar
 Sam Storhers – drums
 Dave Verellen – vocals

Additional musicians
 Shawn Brown – lyrics on "Gypsy Kids"
 Steve Snere (Kill Sadie, These Arms Are Snakes) – additional vocals
 John Spalding (Ninety Pound Wuss, Raft of Dead Monkeys) – additional guitar
 Ben Verellen (Harkonen, Roy) – additional vocals

Production
 Matt Bayles (Minus the Bear) – mixing
 Ed Brooks – mastering
 Chris Common (These Arms Are Snakes) – technical drum assistance
 Narrows – production
 Ben Verellen – production, engineering

Artwork
 Ryan Frederiksen – art direction, photography

References

2009 debut albums
Narrows (band) albums
Deathwish Inc. albums